Hellinsia pichincha is a moth of the family Pterophoridae. It is found in Ecuador.

The wingspan is 24 mm. The forewings are pale yellow and the markings are dark brown. The hindwings are grey and the fringes are pale ochreous-grey. Adults are on wing in November, at an altitude of 2,650 meters.

Etymology
The species is named after the province of its occurrence: Pichincha.

References

Moths described in 2011
pichincha
Moths of South America